Skunkworks Live may refer to two works released by heavy metal singer Bruce Dickinson:
Skunkworks Live EP
Skunkworks Live Video